The 2018 RFL League 1 was a professional rugby league football competition played in England and Wales and is the third tier of the sport for Rugby Football League (RFL) affiliated clubs.

Even before the end of the 2017 season there were news stories that two of the clubs in the league, Gloucestershire All Golds and  Oxford were considering a merger and relocating to Bristol.  Uncertainty around this move meant that the structure of League 1 for 2018 was undecided until October 2017 when the merger was confirmed by the RFL who also announced that the new Bristol side would not play in the league in 2018 and the league for 2018 will comprise only 14 clubs.

The format of the season was very different from the 2017 season.  There was no Super 8s and the season was of 26 games with each of the 14 teams playing each other home and away.  The team finishing top would win automatic promotion to the 2019 Championship and be named league champions for 2018.  The teams finishing second to fifth would meet in two play-off semi-finals with the semi-final winners meeting in the League 1 Promotional Final.  The winner of the Promotional Final will play in the Championship on 2019.  Following a special general meeting of the Rugby Football League on 14 September 2018, the promotion criteria were changed to allow the expansion of the 2019 Championship from 12 clubs to 14 clubs.  Two teams would be promoted as previously agreed however the loser of the Promotion Final would have a further chance at promotion in a single-leg play-off against the team finishing bottom of the Championship with the winner playing in the Championship for 2019.

Oldham and Bradford Bulls were relegated from the Championship in 2017.  During the close season South Wales Ironmen re-branded as West Wales Raiders following the purchase of the club and a move from Merthyr Tydfil to Llanelli in 2017.

New sponsors for the league were announced in January 2018 and the league was known as the Betfred League 1, a name that will remain until the end of 2019 as the bookmakers, Betfred, extended their sponsorship of rugby league to include the Championship and League 1 as well as Super League.

York City Knights won automatic promotion to the 2019 Championship by beating Whitehaven on the last day of the season and ending the season two points ahead of nearest rivals, Bradford Bulls.  Bradford were also promoted after beating Workington Town 27–8 in the promotion final on 7 October 2018.  Defeat for Workington gave them a further shot at promotion in a promotion play-off final on 14 October against Swinton Lions, who finished last in the Championship Shield. Swinton had home advantage in the play-off final following a coin toss between the two clubs and retained their Championship status with a 33–20 victory consigning Workington to another season in League 1.

Post season West Wales Raiders were deducted four points for having fielded an ineligible player during two games; with the team having lost all of their fixtures during the season it meant that they ended the season on minus four points.

Teams

*capacity for rugby league games may differ from official stadium capacity.

Results

Standings

References

2018 in English rugby league
RFL League 1